Abd Al Aziz Awda, also known as Abd al-Aziz Uda or Sheik Odeh (born 20 December 1950), is one of the founders of the Islamic Jihad Movement in Palestine, also known as Palestinian Islamic Jihad (PIJ).

Awda was listed as a "Specially Designated Terrorist" under United States law on 23 January 1995. A decade later, Awda was among the second and most recent group of indicted fugitives to be added to the FBI Most Wanted Terrorists list on 24 February 2006, along with PIJ secretary-general Ramadan Shalah. Awda is the spiritual leader of the PIJ and is still involved in the organization, which has its headquarters located in Damascus, Syria, where he likely still resides, along with other leaders of Palestinian Islamic Jihad.

Early life and education
Awda was born on 20 December 1950 in Jabalia, a village just south of the city of Beit Lahia, in the Gaza Strip.

Awda was educated in Arab and Islamic studies in Cairo, Egypt. He later worked as a lecturer at a university and as an Imam at a mosque, both of which were located in the Gaza Strip.

Palestinian Islamic Jihad activity
Awda and Fathi Shaqaqi founded Islamic Jihad Movement in Palestine, also known as Palestinian Islamic Jihad (PIJ), when it was formed in the Gaza Strip during the 1970s as a branch of the Egyptian Islamic Jihad. Awda also became known as the group's spiritual leader.

Awda was listed as a "Specially Designated Terrorist" under United States law on 23 January 1995. Later that year, Shaqaqi was assassinated in Malta in 1995, and was replaced as secretary-general of PIJ by Ramadan Shalah, who then joined Awda on the U.S. "Specially Designated Terrorist" list on 27 November 1995.

Fellow PIJ members Awda and Shalah were both indicted in a 53 count indictment in the United States District Court for the Middle District of Florida, Tampa, Florida, on Racketeer Influenced and Corrupt Organizations Act (RICO) charges of alleged involvement in racketeering activities for the designated international terrorist organization known as Palestinian Islamic Jihad. Awda is wanted for conspiracy to conduct the affairs of the PIJ through a pattern of racketeering activities such as bombings, murders, extortions, and money laundering. For that indictment, Awda and Shalah then became two of six alleged and indicted terrorist fugitives among the second and most recent group of indicted fugitives to be added to the FBI Most Wanted Terrorists on 24 February 2006.

The Federal Bureau of Investigation (FBI) states that Awda is still involved in PIJ, which has its headquarters located in Damascus, Syria, where Awda likely remains as well. His other aliases listed by the FBI include Abdel Aziz Odeh, Abd Al Aziz Odeh, Abed Al Aziz Odeh, Abu Ahmed, Sheik Awda, Fadl Abu Ahmed, Al Sheik, The Sheik, and Mawlana.

See also
List of fugitives from justice who disappeared

References

External links
 FBI's Most Wanted Terrorists wanted poster of Awda

1950 births
FBI Most Wanted Terrorists
Fugitives wanted by the United States
Fugitives wanted on terrorism charges
Living people
Palestinian imams
Palestinian Islamists
People from the Gaza Strip